Yelena Andreyevna Hahn von Rottenstern (11 January 1814 - 6 July 1842) was a Russian writer known for her contributions to the literary journals Biblioteka Dlya Chteniya and Otechestvennye Zapiski. In addition to her literary works, she is known as the mother of Helena Blavatsky, founder of Theosophy.

Early life and family
She was born Yelena Andreyevna Fadeyeva to a noble family in Rzhyshchiv. Her parents were Andrei Fadeyev, privy councilor and governor of Saratov, and Princess Yelena Pavlovna Dolgorukaya, a member of the princely House of Dolgorukov. Also among her relatives were the poet Evdokiya Rostopchina and Yekaterina Sushkova, a friend of Lermontov, with whom Yelena was also personally acquainted. She was also related to the famous poets Ivan Dolgorukov and Fyodor Tyutchev.

At the age of sixteen, she married Captain Peter Hahn von Rottenstern (1798-1873), a military man almost twice her age, descended from the von Hahn family, which belonged to an old Baltic-German nobility. They had three children, including future writers Helena Blavatsky (born 1831) and Vera Zhelikhovskaya (born 1835). She died of tuberculosis in June 1842, aged 28.

Literary activity

In 1835 she made a partial translation of the Bulwer-Lytton novel Godolphin, which was published in Biblioteka Dlya Chteniya, then edited by her literary mentor Osip Senkovsky. In 1837 her first novel, The Ideal, was serialized under the pseudonym Zeneida R-va. While traveling in the Caucasus in 1837 she met exiled Decembrists, an experience that informed a number of subsequent works, including Memoirs of Zheleznovodsk and Utballa and Jellaleddin, published in 1838. In the following three years she published further stories: Medallion, Court of Light, Theophania Abbiaggio. In 1842 she authored Idle Gift, published in Otechestvennye Zapiski. Her collected works were published in St. Petersburg in 1843, and republished in 1905.

Hahn's literary merits did not go unnoticed by her contemporaries. Many prominent literary figures responded to her works. Ivan Turgenev wrote, "In this woman there was ... both a warm Russian heart and the experience of female life, as well as the passion of conviction." Vissarion Belinsky wrote, "There are writers who live a separate life from their creations, and there are writers whose personality is closely related to their works. Reading the first, you enjoy the divine art without thinking about the artist; reading the second, you enjoy the contemplation of a beautiful human being, think about her, love her, and want to know the details of her life. Our gifted Zeneida R-va (Yelena Hahn) belongs to this second category."

Hahn has been compared to George Sand due to her criticism of male society and her depiction of the position which women occupy in the world and in society, however her prose does not have the same themes as Sand's work.

References

1814 births
1842 deaths
People from Rzhyshchiv
Helena Blavatsky
Russian women writers